Maspin (mammary serine protease inhibitor) is a protein that in humans is encoded by the SERPINB5 gene. This protein belongs to the serpin (serine protease inhibitor) superfamily. SERPINB5 was originally reported to function as a tumor suppressor gene in epithelial cells, suppressing the ability of cancer cells to invade and metastasize to other tissues. Furthermore, and consistent with an important biological function, Maspin knockout mice were reported to be non-viable, dying in early embryogenesis. However, a subsequent study using viral transduction as a method of gene transfer (rather than single cell cloning) was not able to reproduce the original findings and found no role for maspin in tumour biology. Furthermore, the latter study demonstrated that maspin knockout mice are viable and display no obvious phenotype. These data are consistent with the observation that maspin is not expressed in early embryogenesis. The precise molecular function of maspin is thus currently unknown.

Tissue distribution 

Maspin is expressed in the skin, prostate, testis, intestine, tongue, lung, and the thymus.

Serpin superfamily 

Maspin is a member of the serpin superfamily of serine protease inhibitors. The primary function of most members of this family is to regulate the breakdown of proteins by inhibiting the catalytic activity of proteinases. Through this mechanism of action, serpins regulate a number of cellular processes including phagocytosis, coagulation, and fibrinolysis.

Serpins have a complex structure, a key component of which is the reactive site loop, RSL. Inhibitory serpins transition between a stress and relaxed stage. The catalytic serine residue in the protease target attacks the stressed conformation of the RSL loop to form an acyl intermediate.  The loop then undergoes a conformational change to the relaxed state irreversibly trapping the protease in an inactive state.  Hence the serpin functions as a suicide inhibitor of the protease. This transition does not occur in serpins that lack inhibitory activity.

Function 

Given its original reported role in cancer biology, numerous studies have investigated a role for maspin in tumour metastasis.  However, to date no detailed molecular mechanism for maspin function in cell proliferation or tumour biology has been comprehensively described.  Further, it is suggested that original reports of maspin as a tumor suppressor may reflect clonal artefacts rather than true maspin function. Importantly, and in contrast to original reports, maspin knockout mice are viable, displaying no overt phenotype in the absence of suitable biological or environmental challenge.  Accordingly, the molecular function of maspin remains unclear.

From a structural perspective, maspin is a non-inhibitory and obligate intracellular member of the serpin superfamily. Specifically, its RSL does not transition between a stressed and relaxed state following proteolytic cleavage.  This region is also shorter than the RSL loop in other serpins. Accordingly, in the absence of an obvious protease-related function, other targets of maspin have been suggested.  For example, rather than being a protease inhibitor, maspin is proposed to function as an inhibitor of histone deacetylase 1 (HDAC1).

Clinical significance 

A comprehensive analysis of maspin expression in breast cancer revealed no significant correlation between maspin expression and overall survival, distant metastasis-free survival or recurrence-free survival.  Changes in maspin expression may, however, reflect the expression status of the known tumour suppressor PHLPP1.

References

Further reading

External links 
 The MEROPS online database for peptidases and their inhibitors: I04.980
 

Serine protease inhibitors
Human proteins